Wan Pavilion is a Chinese pavilion located in Yuhu District of Changsha, Hunan, China.

History 
The present version was completed in 2017.

Architecture 
It has nine floors inside and five floors outside, which means "jiuwu zhizun (the imperial throne)".

Gallery

References 

Pavilions
Yuhu District
Tourist attractions in Xiangtan
Buildings and structures in Xiangtan